The Legend of Billie Jean is a 1985 American drama film, directed by Matthew Robbins. It stars Helen Slater, Keith Gordon, Christian Slater, Dean Stockwell, Richard Bradford and Peter Coyote.

Plot
Billie Jean Davy, a teenager from Corpus Christi, Texas, is riding with her younger brother, Binx, on his Honda Elite Scooter to a local lake to go swimming. Stopping for a milkshake, they have to deal with Hubie Pyatt, a rowdy local teen, and his friends hitting on Billie Jean, but Binx humiliates Hubie by throwing a milkshake in his face. Later on at the lake, as Billie Jean tells Binx about the weather in Vermont, a place he has always wanted to visit, Hubie steals Binx's scooter.

As Binx goes to retrieve his scooter later that night, Billie Jean goes to the authorities with her friends Putter and Ophelia. They report the theft to Detective Ringwald, who is sympathetic but urges them to wait and see how things play out. When Billie Jean returns home, she finds Binx beaten, and his scooter severely damaged. The next day, Billie Jean, Binx, and Ophelia go to Mr. Pyatt's shop to get the amount of $608 to repair the scooter. While initially appearing helpful and understanding, Pyatt propositions Billie Jean and then attempts to rape her.

Meanwhile, Binx has found a gun in the shop's cash register, and when Billie Jean flees from the back of the store, clearly distressed, he turns it on Mr. Pyatt, who tells him the gun is unloaded, but Binx fires it, wounding Pyatt in the shoulder. They race away from the shop and become fugitives.

By the time Ringwald realizes that he made a mistake not listening to Billie Jean, the situation is spinning out of control. Billie Jean wants only the cash to fix her brother's scooter and an apology from Pyatt. With help from Lloyd Muldaur, the teenage son of the district attorney, who voluntarily becomes her "hostage", Billie Jean makes a video of her demands, featuring herself with her long, blonde hair chopped into a crew cut, inspired after watching a movie about Joan of Arc on TV (the 1957 film Saint Joan) and a revolutionary-style wardrobe including combat boots, fatigue pants, and a wetsuit top with the sleeves torn off. As media coverage increases, Billie Jean becomes a teen icon, and young fans follow her every movement. Facing uncertain dangers, both physical and legal, Billie Jean is forced to turn in her friends Putter and Ophelia to the cops for their safety. When Ringwald arrives at the abandoned miniature golf course where the group has taken refuge and demands to know where Billie Jean is, Ophelia defiantly replies, "Everywhere!"

Pyatt issues a bounty for her apprehension, but Ringwald counters with a more peaceful offer and a promise to repair Binx's scooter. Billie Jean realizes the best plan is to turn herself in. During a rally being held, where a brand new scooter is offered for Billie Jean to turn in herself and Lloyd, Binx puts on a dress and pretends to be Billie Jean, walking behind Lloyd. However, Hubie starts yelling that it isn't Billie Jean, and the police shoot Binx.

Billie Jean runs to catch the ambulance taking Binx away but doesn't make it. She suddenly sees a booth with Billie Jean merchandise, run by Mr. Pyatt. Billie Jean confronts Pyatt and gets him to admit the actions that led to him being shot. He gives Billie Jean the money, but she refuses to take it all and rams her knee into his crotch, sending him sprawling to the ground and knocking over a nearby torch. She then tells him to keep his money and to go buy somebody else, throwing the money back in his face. Pyatt gets to his feet as the overturned torch begins to set his merchandise stands on fire. The onlookers (including Hubie), seeing how Billie Jean was exploited and their indirect involvement in it, throw all the Billie Jean merchandise into the rapidly growing fire and leave in disgust. As the merchandise stands burn down, Billie Jean departs as well, but not before thanking Ringwald and giving Lloyd a kiss. Later, Billie Jean and Binx (in an arm sling) are hitchhiking in Vermont. Binx, after complaining about the cold, admires a red snowmobile.

Cast

Production

 Filming locations included the Sunrise Mall and several locations along South Padre Island Drive.
 The original title of the film was Fair Is Fair.

Soundtrack

Craig Safan produced the original score for the film writing a couple of synthpop-styled instrumental tracks. Furthermore, some rock songs were added to the soundtrack which had never been officially released. The movie's theme song "Invincible" by Pat Benatar peaked at number 10 on the Billboard Hot 100 in September 1985, while the reissue of Billy Idol's single "Rebel Yell" climbed up to number six on the UK Singles Chart in October 1985.

 "Invincible" (Theme from "The Legend of Billie Jean") – Pat Benatar
 "Closing In" – Mark Safan
 "Boys in Town" – Divinyls
 "Heart Telegraph" – Divinyls
 "Rebel Yell" – Billy Idol
 "It’s My Life" – Wendy O. Williams
 "Time to Explain" – Bruce Witkin & The Kids
 "Self Defense" – Chas Sanford

Reception
Jay Boyar of the Orlando Sentinel stated that the film "has quite a lot going for it" and "doesn't get many points for finesse, but it has energy, good performances and more wit than you'd expect." He added, "One reason that sections of the movie are effective is that Helen Slater has enough style and presence to be believable as a young woman who is taken for a modern Joan of Arc. As Billie Jean, she's got the clear eyes of a dreamer and the toughness of a winner." Janet Maslin of The New York Times said that the film is "competently made, sometimes attractively acted (particularly by Peter Coyote)... and bankrupt beyond belief. It's hard to imagine that even the film makers, let alone audiences, can believe in a sweet, selfless heroine who just can't help becoming a superstar." The film holds a 46% approval rating on Rotten Tomatoes, based on 13 reviews.

Home media
The film was released on Betamax and VHS home video in 1985.

In 2009, Sony Pictures Home Entertainment released in Europe a Spanish-titled DVD La Leyenda de Billie Jean, with 4:3 open matte image, but without any bonus material. A remastered NTSC DVD including commentary by Helen Slater and Yeardley Smith was released on November 1, 2011, via their manufactured on demand service.

Mill Creek Entertainment released a retail version of the DVD, along with a Blu-ray edition on July 22, 2014.

See also
 List of American films of 1985
 Social bandit

References

External links

 
 
 

1980s teen drama films
1985 films
American teen drama films
American chase films
Culture of Corpus Christi, Texas
1980s English-language films
Films directed by Matthew Robbins
Films scored by Craig Safan
Films set in Texas
Films shot in Texas
Films shot in Corpus Christi, Texas
TriStar Pictures films
1985 drama films
1980s American films